Metairie Park Country Day School  is a private, nondenominational, co-educational college preparatory school preparatory day school in Metairie, Louisiana, with classes in grades Pre-Kindergarten–12. The  campus is located in the Old Metairie section of Metairie, Louisiana.

Campus 
The campus is highly "wired," with Wi-Fi capability throughout the entire School. Lower School uses multiple technology types with Smart Boards in all classrooms. The Middle School uses Fujitsu Windows technology in the classes with e-versions of textbooks, and a Fujitsu computer program is used in the Upper School for integration with Microsoft OneNote.

Until the 1950s it had a boarding facility.

Academics
Country Day offers comprehensive education for students in grades Pre-kindergarten through 12th grade, organized into Lower, Middle and Upper schools. At grade 3 the option to join the Orchestra is provided and at grade 4 children can join the chorus or band. Choice of foreign languages are offered from Kindergarten to 12th grade and children in Pre-K undergo  one semester of French and one semester of Spanish. From grade 9 onward there are honors options for high-performing students in regards to French and Spanish and from grade 10 onwards students are offered the choice of taking Mandarin as opposed to the two other offered languages.

The school is a member of the Independent Schools Association of the Southwest and the National Association of Independent Schools.

Athletics

Metairie Park Country Day School athletics competes in the LHSAA.

Country Day offers students the ability to participate in many sports, including baseball, football, volleyball, softball, basketball, cross country, golf, soccer, swimming, tennis, and track.

Athletics history
Despite maintaining a "no cut" policy, Country Day's athletic program has brought statewide acclaim. In the upper school, 70 to 80 percent of students participate in at least one sport, with 50 to 60 percent involved in two or more sports. 

From 2001 to 2007 the School has either won the prestigious Southern Quality Ford Cup or was state runner-up. The Southern Quality Ford Cup is the Louisiana High School Athletic Association's (LHSAA) All Sports Award that recognizes the leading overall athletic program in each of the LHSAA's seven classes. The competition is based on a school's performance in the 23 sports governed by the LHSAA; Country Day currently contends in 17 those sports. Any team that finishes in one of the top four places in the state earns points towards the School's quest for the Cup. At the end of the academic year, the school that has accumulated the most points in its class is recognized with this prestigious award.

Tuition
 Full tuition details can be found on the tuition page of our website.

School spirit 
 School mascot: Cajuns
 School colors: Red and Royal Blue
 School song: Flags Fly for Country Day

Administration 
 Head of School: Rob Hereford
 Head of Upper School: Augustine Whyte
 Head of Middle School: Paul Frantz
 Head of Lower School: Mimi Odem

Notable alumni 

Walker Hines, Former Democratic/GOP State Representative, New Orleans
E. D. Hirsch, professor and educational theorist. 
Nicholas Lemann, staff writer, The New Yorker Magazine, Dean Emeritus of the Faculty of Journalism at Columbia University
Thon Maker, NBA player
Graham Patrick Martin, actor
Robert H. Miller 1965, American Surgeon and executive director of the American Board of Otolaryngology
Henry Furlow Owsley III 1973, Investment Banker, CEO of Gordian Group, LLC and Managing Partner of Bacchus Capital Management
Joe Pasternack, college basketball head coach at UC Santa Barbara
Micah Pellerin, former NFL player
Matthew Randazzo V, writer
Peter M. Wolf, author
Aimee Adatto Freeman, Louisiana House of Representatives, District 98

References

External links
Metairie Park Country Day School

Private K-12 schools in Louisiana
Independent Schools Association of the Southwest
Educational institutions established in 1929
Schools in Jefferson Parish, Louisiana
Preparatory schools in Louisiana
1929 establishments in Louisiana
Boarding schools in Louisiana